Warning: Explicit Lyrics is an EP by industrial/hip hop artists Consolidated which was released in 1993.  It consists of remixes of several tracks from earlier albums.

Track listing
 "Guerrillas In The Mist (Album Mix)"  – 4:24
 "Crackhouse (Conference Mix)"  – 5:53
 "You Suck (Jack Dangers Mix)"  – 4:23
 "Unity Of Oppression (Club Mix)"  – 3:32
 "This Is Fascism (Bass Mix)"  – 5:19

Consolidated (band) EPs
1993 EPs